The Southern Apache Museum is a non profit 501 c3 in Houston, Texas located 9600 Hempstead Highway, 550 Northwest Mall. This museum preserves Native American history, traditions, culture in Texas. S.A.M. (Southern Apache museum) was founded by Chance L. Landry, who is of  both Lipan Apache and published author/artist. On display in museum are many original Native American paintings by Chance Landry depicting Native American Indian history in Texas. Southern Apache Museum is open to the general public with a suggested $5.00 donation.

Southern Apache Museum had its grand opening on March 10, 2012.

It closed in 2017 due to the owners of the mall engaging in redevelopment of its space.

References

External links
 Southern Apache Museum - official site

Apache culture
Museums in Houston
Defunct museums in Texas
Native American museums in Texas
Museums established in 2012
2012 establishments in Texas
Museums disestablished in 2017
2017 disestablishments in Texas